The Helensburgh Tigers are an Australian rugby league football team based in Helensburgh, a country town of the Illawarra region. The club are a part of Country Rugby League and has competed in the Illawarra Rugby League premiership since its inception in 1911.

History
The Tigers are a foundation club of the Illawarra Rugby League, playing in the inaugural competition in 1911. Their first game was a 2–0 defeat to Wollongong. The club, however, didn't always compete in first grade since this time and not always did they have a reserve grade team following them. Scarborough fielded a reserves team which followed the Tigers between 1932 and 1935 before the Tigers dropped out of first grade (leaving Scarborough to field a reserves side behind Albion Park) in 1936.

Name and emblem
The Helensburgh team is represented by a tiger, and their emblem is similar to that of the old NSWRL team Balmain Tigers (before they merged with Wests).

Colours
Their colours, gold and black, are also similar to the old Balmain Tigers side.

Women's team
The Helensburgh Tiger Lillies was founded in 2005 Helensburgh Tiger Lilies Women's Rugby League Club are an Australian professional Women's rugby league football team based in Helensburgh, New South Wales.

Notable players
Players that have played in the National and/or Sydney competitions:

 Sam Bremner
 Kezie Apps 
 Jessica Sergis
Damien Cook (2013– Dragons, Bulldogs and South Sydney Rabbitohs)
Josh Starling (2012–17 Rabbitohs, Sea Eagles and Newcastle Knights)
 Justin Poore (2004–14 St. George-Illawarra Dragons, Parramatta Eels, Wakefield and Hull KR)
 Neil Piccinelli (1989–98 Illawarra Steelers, Hunter Mariners and Newcastle Knights)
 Dave Boughton (Sharks and Adelaide Rams back-rower of the 1990s)
 Phil Doran (Sharks player in the 80s)
 Scott Dudman (Sharks, Raiders forward)
 John Griffiths (Sharks lower grader)
 Garry Hammond (Sharks 1982–1985)
 George Jardine (St. George forward, played in their 1949 grand final win with a broken wrist)
 Trevor Kissell (Steelers)
 Allan Holmes (St George 1976–1977)
 Steve Kneen (Sharks, Australian Kangaroo in 1978)
 Bob Lawrence (Balmain forward in 1950's)
 Peter Phillips (Steelers, Balmain and St. George)
 Jack Russell (Balmain 1946)
 Brian Shannon (Western Suburbs Magpies 1957)
 Warren Thompson (Souths, North Sydney, and St. George 1963–70)
 Allan McKean (Easts, and Australian Kangaroo in 1970)
 Barry "Punchy" Nelson (NSW forward, Canterbury president during 1980's premierships)
 Randall Barge (St. George 1979)
 John Cox (Newtown 1964–66)

Source:

Team honours
 Illawarra Rugby League First Grade Premierships: 4
 1986, 1988, 1993, 2015 
 Illawarra Rugby League Reserve Grade Premierships: 5
 1952, 1960, 1961, 2012, 2014
 Clayton Cup: Nil

Source:

References

External links
 Helensburgh Tigers Homepage
 Country Rugby League Homepage 
 Country Rugby League
 Illawarra Rugby League Homepage
 Group 7 Rugby League

Rugby clubs established in 1911
1911 establishments in Australia
Rugby league teams in New South Wales
Rugby league teams in Wollongong